Astra 1K was a communications satellite manufactured by Alcatel Space for SES. Intended to replace the Astra 1B satellite and provide backup for 1A, 1C and 1D at the Astra 19.2°E orbital position, the Blok DM3 upper stage of the Proton-K launch vehicle failed to function properly, leaving the satellite in an unusable parking orbit.

Launch 
Astra 1K was to be a European (Luxembourg-based) geostationary communications satellite that was launched by a Proton-K launch vehicle from Baikonur Cosmodrome at 23:04:23 UTC on 25 November 2002. In an effort to prevent imminent re-entry, the satellite was raised to a circular orbit at an altitude of 288 km, providing sufficient time to select the best course of action. Three options were then under consideration: a) to force its re-entry over the Pacific Ocean, b) to retrieve it by a Space Shuttle, and c) to use up all the fuel on board the satellite to move it to a geostationary orbit at 19.2° east. Although it was suggested that a separately-launched Orbital Recovery Corporation 'space tug' (then in development) might be used to take the satellite to geostationary orbit, the decision was taken in December 2002 to deorbit the satellite, resulting in a huge insurance loss and bringing into question both continued use of the Blok D series of upper stages and the "bigger is better" communications satellite philosophy. Astra 1K was intentionally de-orbited on 10 December 2002.

Overview 
The satellite featured frequency re-use for some of its transponders, using dual patterns coverage, one covering eastern Europe, the other covering Spain. This design was meant to cover specific markets only, in order to expand the capacity of the fleet, as frequency re-use enables more channels to be transmitted simultaneously at the same frequency, with the drawback that channels broadcast on the Spain beam wouldn't be receivable by any means (no matter how large the receiving dish would be) in the east beam and vice versa. This would have left for example the Netherlands and parts of neighbouring countries without reception of either of the beams, as the beams overlap over those countries, efficiently jamming each other.

Astra 1K also featured multiple Ka-Band capabilities, originally intended to provide an upload path for satellite Internet access services. SES later developed such a 2-way commercial satellite internet service with ASTRA2Connect (now Astra Connect), using Ku-band for upload and download paths.

Replacement satellite 
A replacement satellite, Astra 1KR was successfully launched in 2006.

See also 

 SES
 Astra
 Astra 19.2°E
 Astra 1A
 Astra 1B
 Astra 1C
 Astra 1KR

References

External links 
  Astra 1K, Günter's Space page
 Astra Connect website

Astra satellites
Spacecraft launched in 2002
Satellite launch failures
2002 in Luxembourg
Satellites of Luxembourg
Satellites using the Spacebus bus
2002 in Kazakhstan
Space accidents and incidents in Kazakhstan